The Watermill (c. 1660) is an oil on canvas painting by the Dutch landscape painter Jacob van Ruisdael.
It is an example of Dutch Golden Age painting and is now in the collection of the National Gallery of Victoria.

This painting was documented by Hofstede de Groot in 1911, who wrote:

This scene is very similar to other paintings Ruisdael and his pupil Hobbema made in this period and these often served as inspiration for later painters of landscape.

Scholars have tried to locate this specific watermill as it was portrayed so many times, but so far it has only been documented as being "somewhere in Gelderland."

References

1660s paintings
Paintings by Jacob van Ruisdael
Paintings in the collection of the National Gallery of Victoria
Water in art